Nechanice is a town in Hradec Králové District in the Hradec Králové Region of the Czech Republic. It has about 2,300 inhabitants.

Administrative parts
Villages of Komárov, Lubno, Nerošov, Sobětuš, Staré Nechanice, Suchá and Tůně are administrative parts of Nechanice.

Geography
It lies in the East Elbe Table.

History
The first written mention of Nechanice is from 1228. In 1867, it was promoted to a town. Nechanice lost the town status in 1949, but it was restored in 1992.

Sights
The landmark of Nechanice is the Church of the Assumption of the Virgin Mary. The original church, which was as old as the town, was completely destroyed by a fire in 1827. The current Empire church replaced it in 1833.

Notable people
Ignác Raab (1715–1787), painter
Johann Baptist Wanhal (1739–1813), composer
Jan Nowopacký (1821–1908), painter
Alois Rašín (1867–1923), politician and economist
Vladimír Hubáček (1932–2021), rally driver

Twin towns – sister cities

Nechanice is twinned with:
 Czarny Bór, Poland

See also
Nechanitz, Texas, United States, unincorporated community named after Nechanice

References

External links

Cities and towns in the Czech Republic
Populated places in Hradec Králové District